Air France Flight 212 was a Boeing 707-328C, registration F-BLCJ, that crashed into the northwestern slope of La Soufrière Mountain, in Guadeloupe on 6 March 1968, with the loss of all 63 lives on board. The aircraft, named "Chateau de Lavoute Polignac", was operating the Caracas–Pointe-à-Pitre sector of Air France's South America route.

When air traffic control had cleared the flight deck crew for a visual approach to Le Raizet Airport's runway 11, the crew had reported the airfield in sight. The site is uphill from Saint-Claude and the Matouba hot springs.

The accident investigators cited the probable cause as a visual approach procedure at night in which the descent was begun from an incorrectly identified point. The aircraft had flown for 33 hours since coming off the Boeing production line, and was on her second revenue service (her maiden passenger flight was the previous day's outbound journey from Paris).

The accident came six years after Air France Flight 117, another Boeing 707, crashed into a mountain further north on the same island while on approach to Point-à-Pitre's Le Raizet airport. Less than two years later, on 4 December 1969, Air France suffered another crash on the same leg of Flight 212 when the aircraft crashed shortly after take-off from Caracas.

References

Bibliography

 Il y a 44 ans, un Boeing s’écrasait en Guadeloupe

External links
Final Accident Report posted at the BEA (France) 


Aviation accidents and incidents in 1968
Accidents and incidents involving the Boeing 707
212
Aviation accidents and incidents in Guadeloupe
1968 in Guadeloupe
March 1968 events in North America